The paratriathlon competitions at the 2016 Summer Paralympics in Rio de Janeiro took place from 10–12 September 2016 at Fort Copacabana. Sixty athletes competed across two genders, and six events. This was the first Paralympic Games to feature paratriathlon, one of two new sports (along with paracanoe) added to the schedule for 2016.

Format
The Paralympic triathlon contained three components; a  swim,  cycle, and a  run. The competition took the form of a single event between all competitors with no heats. The competition took place across four of the five recognised paratriathlon classifications; both genders  competed in the PT2 and PT4 classifications, the PT1 category for men only, where wheelchair athletes used handcycles on the cycling leg, and racing wheelchairs on the run leg, and the PT5 category for women only, where women with visual impairments were assisted by a sighted guide, using a tandem bicycle on the cycling leg; as with other events for blind and visually impaired athletes, any guide did not count as a quota athlete but was awarded a medal as appropriate.

No competition was held in the PT3 classification in 2016.

Qualification
In 2016, the field was largely selected on the basis of rankings, although spaces were reserved for the nation represented by the 2015 World Champion in each classification, two host nation athletes, and eight selections from the Bipartite Commission. If host nation athletes qualified using the ITU Rankings criteria, the host nation places were reduced, and awarded instead by the Bipartite Commission.

A National Paralympic Committee (NPC) was allowed to allocated a maximum of two qualification slots per medal event for a maximum total of twelve qualification slots in 2016. Exceptions were made via the Bipartite Commission Invitation Allocation method.

To be eligible for selection by an NPC, athletes had to:
 be ranked on the ITU Paralympic Qualification List closing 30 June 2016;
 be internationally classified with either of the following - 
'Confirmed' sport class status 
'Review' sport class status with a review date after 31 December 2016.

Ten places, not including guides in the PT5 classification, were available for each of the six events, awarded as follows:

Medal summary

Medal table

Events

References

 
2016 in triathlon
2016 Summer Paralympics events
2016
Triathlon competitions in Brazil